Weerman degradation, also named Weerman reaction, is a name reaction in organic chemistry. It is named after Rudolf Adrian Weerman, who discovered it in 1910. In general, it is an organic reaction in carbohydrate chemistry in which amides are degraded by sodium hypochlorite, forming an aldehyde with one less carbon. Some have regarded it as an extension of the Hofmann rearrangement.

Degradation of α-hydroxy-substituted carbonic acid amides
The Weermann degradation could be executed with α-hydroxy-substituted carbonic acid amides. For example, sugar.

General reaction scheme 
During the degradation of α-hydroxy-substituted carbonic acid amides, the carbon chain shortens by one carbon-atom.

The reaction proceeds very slowly at room temperature, therefore the reaction mixture is heated up to 60-65 °C.

Mechanism 
The reaction mechanism is that of the related Hofmann degradation. 

At first the carbonic acid amide (1) reacts with the sodium hypochlorite. After the separation of water and chloride an amine with a free bond is built 2. The intermediate (3) is generated by rearrangement. In the next step a hydrolysis takes place. Water is added at the carbon-atom with the number '1'. A hydroxylic group is generated. The last step is that an acidic amide is separated and the aldehyde (4) is generated.

Degradation of α,β-unsaturated carbonic acid amides 
Additionally the Weerman degradation could be executed with α,β-unsaturated carbonic acid amides. For example, acrylamide.

General reaction scheme 
During the degradation of α-hydroxy-substituted carbonic acid amides, the carbon chain shortens about one carbon-atom, too. 

The reaction is very slow at room temperature, therefore the reaction mixture is heated up to 60–65 °C.

Mechanism 
The reaction mechanism is that of the related Hofmann degradation. 

At first the carbonic acid amide (1) reacts with the sodium hypochlorite. After separate water and chloride an amine with a free bond is build 2. The intermediate (3) is generated by rearrangement. At this point two different mechanisms are possible. In the mechanism above two methanol molecules reacts with the intermediate. So is the compound (4) generated. After this carbon dioxide, water, ammonium and methanol are separated in different steps. At least it is protonated into an aldehyde (5).

Until the intermediate (3) the mechanism is the same like above. Then only one methanol-atom is added 4. With a protonation water, methanol and carbon dioxide are separated. An ammonium ion (5) is generated. During the hydrolysis a hydroxylic group is built 6. An aldehyde (7) is generated by separating an ammonium ion.

Applications
One study demonstrated the direct oxidation of glucose to arabinose by the same sodium hypochlorite, skipping the aldonic acid and aldoamide steps. For example, the general degradation of D-gluconamide into D-arabinose:

On top of that, the Weerman test could be used to show whether a hydroxylic group is beside the amido group. This reaction is only important in a historical sense because it is slow yielding and thus rarely used.

See also
Curtius rearrangement
Hofmann degradation
Ruff–Fenton degradation
Wohl degradation

References

Rearrangement reactions
Carbohydrates
Degradation reactions
Name reactions